The second season of the FX legal drama series Damages premiered on January 7, 2009 and concluded on April 1, 2009. It consisted of thirteen episodes, bringing the series total to 26. Damages was created by brothers Todd and Glenn Kessler along with Daniel Zelman, each of whom served as executive producers and contributed seven scripts for the season, including the premiere and the finale.

The second season, like the first, follows two different timelines. The primary timeline follows Patty, Ellen, and Tom as the firm goes up against an energy company who have engaged in unethical practices. A former lover of Patty's, Daniel Purcell (William Hurt), brings the matter to her attention, but then inexplicably backs out, leaving Patty up against UNR CEO Walter Kendrick (John Doman) and his fierce lawyer Claire Maddox (Marcia Gay Harden). Meanwhile, Ellen works with the FBI to bring down Patty, while also seeking revenge on Arthur Frobisher for his presumed role in her fiance's death. Ellen is unaware that Patty is suspicious of her, and that Frobisher's criminal connections appear to extend to her new friend Wes (Timothy Olyphant).

A second timeline takes place six months later, when Ellen meets with an unknown person in a hotel room, and subsequently appears to shoot the person.

Cast and characters

Main cast 
 Glenn Close as Patty Hewes (13 episodes)
 Rose Byrne as Ellen Parsons (13 episodes)
 Tate Donovan as Thomas Shayes (12 episodes)
 Anastasia Griffith as Katie Connor (7 episodes)
 Marcia Gay Harden as Claire Maddox (7 episodes)
 Timothy Olyphant as Wes Krulik (9 episodes)
 Ted Danson as Arthur Frobisher (5 episodes)
 William Hurt as Daniel Purcell (10 episodes)

Recurring cast

Episodes

Production 
FX renewed the series for a second season that began airing in January 2009. It was originally scheduled to begin airing during summer 2008, but due to the Writer's Guild Strike, it was pushed back, resulting with the production for season 2 starting exactly 11 months after the series premiered on FX.

Reception

Awards and nominations 
For its second season, Damages was nominated for seven Primetime Emmy nominations at the 2009 Primetime Emmy Awards, with Glenn Close receiving her second Emmy nomination for Outstanding Lead Actress in a Drama Series. Ted Danson also received another nomination, for Outstanding Guest Actor in a Drama Series. Rose Byrne earned her first Emmy nomination for Outstanding Supporting Actress in a Drama Series and William Hurt was nominated for Outstanding Supporting Actor in a Drama Series. The series again was nominated for direction and the show itself was nominated again for Outstanding Drama Series. On September 20, 2009, the show won its fourth Emmy Award when Glenn Close won the Emmy for Outstanding Lead Actress in a Drama Series.

The series earned three nominations at the 67th Golden Globe Awards, including Close for Best Actress, and Byrne and Hurt for their supporting roles.

Critical reviews 
The second season of Damages was met with mostly high praise, and it earned 81 out of 100 based on 18 reviews on the aggregate review website Metacritic, which qualifies as "universal acclaim". On Rotten Tomatoes, the season has an approval rating of 90% with an average score of 8.7 out of 10 based on 21 reviews. The website's critical consensus reads, "Thrilling and captivating, Damages is the epitome of a well-made melodramatic crime thriller, with addictive storylines and an enthralling performance by Glenn Close."

References

External links 
 

2009 American television seasons
season 2